Nawëal Ouinekh-Youssouf (born 8 January 1997), known as Nawëal Ouinekh, is a footballer who plays as a forward for Division 2 Féminine club Saint-Étienne and the Morocco national team.

Born in France, Ouinekh represented her native country internationally at youth level, before switching allegiance to Morocco in 2020.

International career
Ouinekh made her senior debut for Morocco on 26 November 2020, against Ghana.

Personal life
Ouinekh is married to Zaydou Youssouf.

See also
List of Morocco women's international footballers

References

External links
 

1997 births
Living people
Citizens of Morocco through descent
Moroccan women's footballers
Women's association football forwards
Morocco women's international footballers
Footballers from Bordeaux
French women's footballers
FC Girondins de Bordeaux (women) players
AS Saint-Étienne (women) players
Division 1 Féminine players
France women's youth international footballers
French sportspeople of Moroccan descent